Shela Bagh (Also spelled Shelabagh) is a town in Qila Abdullah district of Balochistan province of the Pakistan. It is located next to Shelabagh Cantonment on Quetta-Chaman Highway (N-25).

This town is famous for its railway station and gateway of the Khojak tunnel also known as Shela Bagh tunnel.

References

Populated places in Killa Abdullah District

Qila Abdullah District